Elyes Baccar is a Tunisian feature film and documentary director, writer and producer. He is best known for his work on the films She & He, Lost in Tunisia and Tunis by Night.

Life and career 
Elyes was born in Tunis, Tunisia. He studied Directing at the French CLCF in Paris. He also attended FEMIS training program in Paris and the cultural manager program at Goethe-Institut in Berlin. He started his career as an assistant director to films such as Star Wars in Tunisia shooting.

In 2006, Elyes directed his first feature film She & he (Elle et Lui), premiered in international film festivals. In 2011, his first feature documentary Rouge Parole, about the Tunisian revolution. His second feature film Tunis by night (Tunis Ellil), premiered at the Cairo International Film Festival in 2017. He was guest speaker at Columbia University, Goethe-Institut and the German Commission for UNESCO.

Filmography

References

External links
 

1971 births
Living people
Tunisian film directors
Tunisian television directors